The 4th Regiment of Riflemen was a unit of the U.S. Army in the early nineteenth century. It was first activated in 1814 during the War of 1812 when the War Department created three additional rifle regiments based on the success of the Regiment of Riflemen. The regiment was deactivated in May 1815.

Organization
The regiment was activated on February 10, 1814. It was consolidated with the other regiments of riflemen on May 17, 1815.

Service
Regimental depots were placed in Utica, New York and western Pennsylvania. Elements of the regiment participated with the 1st Regiment of Riflemen in relieving the Siege of Fort Erie

Notes

References

Rifle regiments of the United States Army
Military units and formations established in 1814
Military units and formations disestablished in 1815
American military units and formations of the War of 1812